Interstate 795 (I-795), also known as the Northwest Expressway, is a  auxiliary Interstate Highway linking Baltimore's northwestern suburbs of Pikesville, Owings Mills, and Reisterstown, Maryland, to the Baltimore Beltway (I-695). The route bypasses Maryland Route 140 (MD 140; Reisterstown Road), carrying part of the Maryland Transit Administration (MTA)'s Baltimore Metro SubwayLink in its median for a  stretch, and provides direct access to former Owings Mills Mall. It never connects to its parent, I-95, except via I-695.

Route description

I-795 begins in Pikesville at a directional T interchange with I-695 (Baltimore Beltway), which heads south toward Glen Burnie and east toward Towson. I-695 provides access to I-95 in the directions of Washington, D.C. and Philadelphia to highways into Baltimore. Immediately to the east of the interchange is Old Court station of the MTA's Baltimore Metro SubwayLink, which passes through the interchange and settles into the median of the six-lane freeway as they cross Gwynns Falls. I-795 parallels and has two crossings of CSX Transportation's Hanover Subdivision as the freeway and transit line head northwest. The subway line ends just north of its and the highway's second crossing of Gwynns Falls at terminal Owings Mills station.

Immediately to the northwest of the subway terminus is I-795's interchange with Owings Mills Boulevard (unsigned MD 940), which is a partial cloverleaf interchange with flyover ramps from northbound I-795 to southbound Owings Mills Boulevard and from the southbound boulevard to the southbound Interstate. The interchange also features direct ramps with Metro Centre at Owings Mills to and from the direction of Baltimore and direct ramps with the subway station to and from the direction of Reisterstown. I-795 continues northwest as a four-lane freeway. The highway has a partial cloverleaf interchange with Franklin Boulevard before reaching its northern terminus at MD 140 on the edge of Reisterstown. The terminus consists of direct ramps with MD 140 to and from the direction of Westminster and an intersection with MD 140 (Westminster Pike) and MD 795, an unnamed and unsigned connector between the intersection and an intersection with MD 30 and MD 128 on the north side of Reisterstown.

History
The Northwest Expressway was one of the first freeways planned for construction in the state of Maryland. The first  section to the Owings Mills exit was completed in 1985; the remaining  were completed in 1987.

The original plan was for the highway to run into the city of Baltimore along a similar route to that of the Baltimore Metro SubwayLink. Plans to extend the highway beyond its current configuration have not been sought out by highway officials in Maryland. This alignment would most likely have terminated at the northern terminus of Wabash Avenue (at Patterson Avenue), which parallels the elevated section of the Baltimore Metro SubwayLink.

Exit list

See also

References

External links

MDRoads: I-795
Scott M. Kozel's Roads to the Future article on I-795
Steve Anderson's DCRoads.net: Northwest Expressway (I-795)

95-7 Maryland
95-7
7 Maryland
Roads in Baltimore County, Maryland